Nicolas Di Filippo (born 9 July 1993) is an Italian footballer who plays for Vastese Calcio 1902.

Club career

Early career
Born in Guardiagrele, in the Province of Chieti, Abruzzo region, Di Filippo started his career at SPAL Lanciano (originally founded as San Pietro Apostolo Lanciano), also located in the Province of Chieti. In July 2007, Di Filippo and Mattia Di Vincenzo were signed by Tuscan team Siena.

Virtus Lanciano
Circa 2008, Di Filippo returned to Lanciano for Virtus Lanciano. Di Filippo was the member of "student" under-17 team in 2008–09 and 2009–10 season. From 2010 to 2012, Di Filippo was a member of the "Berretti" youth team.

Di Filippo also played 3 times in the Lega Pro Prima Divisione for the first team, in the 2 out of last 3 rounds in 2010–11 season, as well as the round 22 in 2011–12 season.

On 22 July 2012, Di Filippo left for the fourth division club Chieti on a temporary deal, along with Luca Verna. Di Filippo was linked to Chieti on 7 July, but still received pre-season call-up from Lanciano on 21 July.

The temporary deal was renewed on 31 August 2013. He also played for Lanciano as unused bench in 2013–14 Coppa Italia.

On 4 August 2014, he was signed by Melfi.

Serie C clubs
On 10 July 2016, Di Filippo was signed by Sambenedettese.

On 11 July 2017, Di Filippo left for Reggina on a one-year contract. On 24 January 2018, Di Filippo left for Cuneo.

Serie D clubs
In September 2018, Di Filippo joined Serie D club Prato.

References

External links
 AIC profile (data by www.football.it) 
 
 

1993 births
Sportspeople from the Province of Chieti
Living people
Italian footballers
Association football central defenders
A.C.N. Siena 1904 players
S.S. Virtus Lanciano 1924 players
S.S. Chieti Calcio players
A.S. Melfi players
A.S. Sambenedettese players
Reggina 1914 players
A.C. Cuneo 1905 players
A.C. Prato players
A.S.D. Cassino Calcio 1924 players
S.S. Fidelis Andria 1928 players
Vastese Calcio 1902 players
Serie B players
Serie C players
Serie D players
Footballers from Abruzzo